The 2018 UCI Mountain Bike World Championships was the 29th edition of the UCI Mountain Bike World Championships. It was held from 5 to 9 September 2018 in Lenzerheide, Switzerland. The four-cross competitions were held in Val di Sole, Italy from 5 to 6 July 2018

Medal summary

Medal table

Men's events

Women's events

Team events

See also
2018 UCI Mountain Bike World Cup

References

External links
Official website

UCI Mountain Bike World Championships
International cycle races hosted by Switzerland
2018 in mountain biking
2018 in Swiss sport
UCI Mountain Bike World Cup